SS Gothic was an ocean liner, built in 1893 at the Harland and Wolff Shipyards for the White Star Line. She was 490 ft long and 53 ft wide and 7755 gross registered tons. For much of her career she was transferred back and forth between White Star and the Red Star Line, both of which were subsidiaries of the International Mercantile Marine.

Initially she travelled the London to New Zealand route. Gothic caught fire in 1906, and was subsequently repaired. Following this, she was converted into an immigrant ship and chartered to the Red Star Line as SS Gothland. This was short-lived, as in 1911, she was transferred back to White Star with her name returned to Gothic. Two years later, she once again served the Red Star Line as Gothland. She now ran the Antwerp to New York run. In May 1921 she reverted yet again to White Star but kept the name Gothland. In 1924 she ran aground. After examination it was decided that the ship was no longer economically viable and she was scrapped in 1925.

References

External links
Several interior images of the Gothic's first class accommodations

Ships of the White Star Line
1893 ships
Ships built in Belfast
Ships built by Harland and Wolff